Cyril Serredszum (born 2 October 1971) is a French football coach and scout and former professional player who played as a midfielder. He works as a scout for FC Metz.

Career
Serredszum played for Metz, Montpellier and Martigues. While at Metz he played in the final as they won the 1995–96 Coupe de la Ligue.

He was a coach at Luxembourg club Fola Esch between May and July 2011.

In December 2020, Serredszum was hired as a scout for FC Metz.

Honours
Metz
Coupe de la Ligue: 1995–96

Montpellier
UEFA Intertoto Cup: 1999

References

External links
 
 
 

1971 births
Living people
Association football midfielders
French footballers
Ligue 1 players
FC Metz players
Montpellier HSC players
FC Martigues players
CSO Amnéville players
French football managers
Expatriate football managers in Luxembourg
French expatriate sportspeople in Luxembourg
French expatriate football managers
CS Fola Esch managers
FC Progrès Niederkorn managers
RC Strasbourg Alsace non-playing staff
FC Metz non-playing staff